Stephania is a genus of flowering plants in the family Menispermaceae, native to eastern and southern Asia and Australia. They are herbaceous perennial vines, growing to around four metres tall, with a large tuber. The leaves are arranged spirally on the stem and are peltate, with the leaf petiole attached near the centre of the leaf. The name Stephania comes from the Greek, "a crown". This refers to the anthers being arranged in a crown-like manner.

One species, S. tetrandra, is among the 50 fundamental herbs used in traditional Chinese medicine, where it is called han fang ji (漢防己, "Chinese fang ji"). Other plants named fang ji  are sometimes substituted for it. Other varieties substituted include Cocculus thunbergii, C. trulobus, Aristolochia fangchi, Stephania tetrandria, and Sinomenium acutum. Notable among these is guang fang ji (廣防己, "(GuangDong, GuangXi) fang ji", Aristolochia fangchi. Because of its toxicity, it is used in TCM only with great caution.

Selected species 
There are about 45 species in the genus Stephania, native to the Far East and Australasia. Species include:

Fossil species
Stephania palaeosudamericana Herrera et al.

Synonyms
Stephania erecta Craib (syn. Stephania pierrei Diels)

Toxicity 

There is evidence that a few species of Stephania are toxic. However, the most commonly available species in the United States,  Stephania tetrandra, has not been shown to be toxic. Any confusion regarding the possible toxicity of Stephania tetrandra was entirely due to an inadvertent shipment of  Aristolochia fangchi sent in its stead to a Belgian clinic in 1993. The errant batch of Aristolochia was later confirmed via phytochemical analysis.

Chemistry 
Chemical investigation of Stephania rotunda Lour. growing in Vietnam in 2005 led to the isolation and structural elucidation of three new alkaloids, 5-hydroxy-6,7-dimethoxy-3,4-dihydroisoquinolin-1(2H)-one, thaicanine 4-O-beta-D-glucoside, as well as (−)-thaicanine N-oxide (4-hydroxycorynoxidine), along with 23 known alkaloids.

References

External links 

Introduction to Rotundine
Flora of China: Stephania species list
Flora of Nepal: Stephania species list

 
Medicinal plants
Menispermaceae genera
Dioecious plants
Caudiciform plants